FRAS1-related extracellular matrix protein 1 is a protein that in humans is encoded by the FREM1 gene.

References

Further reading

External links
  GeneReviews/NCBI/NIH/UW entry on Manitoba Oculotrichoanal Syndrome, Marles Syndrome, MOTA Syndrome